Yunfeng Capital (YF Capital) is a Shanghai-based private equity firm founded in 2010. It was founded by Jack Ma (founder and former executive chairman of Alibaba) and David Yu (founder of Target Media).

Background 
Yunfeng Capital was founded in 2010 by Jack Ma and David Yu. 'Yunfeng' is the result of combining the Chinese first names of Jack (Yun) Ma and David (Feng) Yu.

The firm focuses on early and growth stage investments in companies from various sectors such as technology, healthcare, financial services and media. In addition, it provides consultation and advisory services to its selected portfolio companies.

Yunfeng Capital is headquartered in Shanghai with additional offices in Beijing, Hangzhou and Hong Kong.

Yunfeng Financial Group 

In 2015, Yunfeng Capital (through Yunfeng Financial Holdings and several other investment vehicles) acquired Reorient Group Limited, a brokerage firm listed in Hong Kong.

In November 2016, Reorient Group Limited, was renamed to Yunfeng Financial Group. Yunfeng Financial Group is listed on the Stock Exchange of Hong Kong (ticker symbol: 376).

In August 2017, the group agreed to acquire the Asia unit of MassMutual for US$1.7 billion which was completed in November 2018. In March 2019, the unit was rebranded to YF Life.

As of 2021, 47% of the group's shares are effectively owned in aggregate by David Yu and Yunfeng Capital.

Funds

Notable investments 

 Alibaba Group
 Ant Group
 BGI Group
 Cainiao
 CITIC 21CN
 Focus Media
 Kuaishou
 Mindray
 Momenta
 Momo
 Septwolves
Sina Sports
 Sogou
 Tencent QQ
 VIPKid
 Xiaomi
 Xiaozhu
 Xpeng
 Youku
 Xingyun Group

References

External links
Company website
Yunfeng Financial website

Chinese companies established in 2010
Financial services companies established in 2010
Investment management companies of China
Private equity firms of China
Venture capital firms of China